The bise is a northern wind in France and Switzerland.

Bise or BISE may also refer to:

Places
Lake Bise, France
Bise (crater), a crater on Mars

People with the surname
Marguerite Bise, French chef

Other uses
Board of Intermediate and Secondary Education (disambiguation), multiple bodies
Bodies in the space environment, a project on the International Space Station
Business & Information Systems Engineering, a German journal Wirtschaftsinformatik
"La Bise" the french name for cheek kissing

See also
Cornettes de Bise